Mad, Bad and Dangerous to Know may refer to:

"Mad, bad, and dangerous to know", a phrase used by Lady Caroline Lamb (1785–1828) to describe her lover Lord Byron
Mad, Bad and Dangerous to Know (Dead or Alive album), 1986
Mad, Bad and Dangerous to Know (EP by Joolz Denby with New Model Army), 1986
Mad, Bad, and Dangerous to Know (The Cross album), 1990
"Mad, Bad & Dangerous to Know", a 2005 song by Blue Tears from Mad, Bad and Dangerous
Mad, Bad and Dangerous to Know, a 2008 book by Ranulph Fiennes
Mad, Bad, Dangerous to Know: The Fathers of Wilde, Yeats and Joyce, a 2018 book by Colm Tóibín
Mad, Bad & Dangerous to Know, a 2020 novel by Samira Ahmed
Mad, Bad, dangerous to know, self-descriptive statement made by Flip in 2022 Slumberland_(film)

See also
Mad, Bad and Dangerous?: The Scientist and the Cinema, a 2005 book by Christopher Frayling
A Mad, Bad, and Dangerous People?: England 1783–1846, a 2006 book by Boyd Hilton